Myelopsis immundella is a species of snout moth in the genus Episcythrastis. It was described by George Duryea Hulst in 1890. It is found in North America.

References

Moths described in 1890
Phycitini